The 2021 P. League+ playoffs was the postseason tournament of the 2020–21 P. League+ season. The playoffs began on April 23 and was early ended on May 15 due to the Taiwanese pandemic restrictions after Game 4 of the 2021 P. League+ Finals. The Taipei Fubon Braves, leading 3–1 in the Finals, was declared the champion after the remaining Finals games were cancelled.

Format
The top three seed qualify the playoffs. The second and third seeds play the best-of-five playoffs series, which is in a 2-2-1 format. The winner advances and plays the top seed in the best-of-seven finals series, which is in a 2-2-1-1-1 format. The seeding is based on each team's regular season record. Home court advantage goes to the higher seed for both series.

Playoff qualifying

Bracket

Bold Series winner
Italic Team with home-court advantage

Playoffs: (2) Taoyuan Pilots vs. (3) Formosa Taishin Dreamers

P. League+ Finals: (1) Taipei Fubon Braves vs. (3) Formosa Taishin Dreamers

References

Playoffs
P. League+ playoffs
2021 in Taiwanese sport
April 2021 sports events in Asia
May 2021 sports events in Asia